Lloyd Linton (born 1 July 1988) is a professional rugby union referee who represented the Scottish Rugby Union. He has since moved to Germany to continue his medical career.

Rugby union career

Playing career

Amateur career

He played rugby union for Instonians, the Royal Belfast Academical Institution's Former Pupils club.

Referee career

Professional career

Linton refereed his first Pro12 match in April 2013; a match between Cardiff Blues and Zebre.

He was offered a contract by the Scottish Rugby Union in 2014.

He has gone on to referee matches in the Pro14.

He has also been Assistant Referee in the European Rugby Champions Cup; refereed in the European Rugby Challenge Cup and also in South Africa

International career

Linton was named as referee in the 2016 Nations Cup; also known as the Rugby Europe International Championships.

Outside of rugby

Linton is also a qualified doctor. He moved to Germany to continue his medical career; but as rugby union is a growing sport there, opportunities are there to continue refereeing.

References

External links
Lloyd Linton in the Pro14 Italian Derby

1988 births
Living people
Scottish rugby union referees
EPCR Challenge Cup referees
Rugby union officials
Instonians rugby union players
Irish rugby union players
Irish rugby union referees
United Rugby Championship referees